Fiji Airways (trading as and formerly known as Air Pacific) is the flag carrier airline of Fiji and operates international services from its hubs in Fiji to 13 countries and 26 cities including, Australia, New Zealand, Samoa, Tonga, Tuvalu, Kiribati, Vanuatu and Solomon Islands (Oceania), Hong Kong, Japan, Singapore, Canada and the United States. It has an extended network of 108 international destinations through its codeshare partners. The Fiji Airways Group brings in 64 percent of all visitors who fly to Fiji, employs over 1000 employees, and earns revenues of over FJD$815 million (US$390m).

The first commercial flight as Fiji Airways was made in 1951 but the airline's origins date back to Katafaga Estates Ltd. formed in 1947. After being acquired by Qantas in 1958, Katafaga Estates was retooled as a regional airline and renamed Air Pacific. In May 2012, MD/CEO David Pflieger announced that as the final part of the airline's successful turnaround, the airline would be returning to its former name of Fiji Airways to reinforce its role as the national airline of Fiji. The Fiji government owns 52% of the airline and Qantas 46%, with the governments of several Pacific island nations holding the remainder. 

The airline plans to replace five of its older Boeing 737s with Boeing's new 737 MAX 8s, at a list price of about US$110 million each. Two of the new aircraft arrived in 2018, and the remainder in 2019. The airline is also currently leasing two Airbus A350-900 aircraft. The 737 MAX 8s are intended for Fiji Airways' regional services to Australia, New Zealand, Hawaii, Kiribati, Samoa, Solomon Islands, Tonga and Vanuatu, while the Airbus A350-900s, A330-200s and A330-300s are intended for longer services such as the United States, Canada and Singapore.

History

Origins

The airline was founded by Australian aviator Harold Gatty who in 1931 had been the navigator on a record-breaking round-the-world flight with Wiley Post. Gatty moved to Fiji after World War II and registered the airline in 1947 as Katafaga Estates Ltd., after the coconut estate Gatty had established on Fiji's eastern island group. Gatty renamed the airline as Fiji Airways in September 1951. The New Zealander Fred Ladd was Fiji Airways' first Chief Pilot.

Air Pacific
After Gatty's death in 1958, Fiji Airways was acquired by Qantas. Initially, Qantas tried to create international support for a multinational, shared, regional airline. By 1966 Fiji Airways's shareholders included the governments of Tonga, Western Samoa, Nauru, Kiribati and the Solomon Islands. By 1968, Qantas, Air New Zealand, British Overseas Airways Corporation and the Fiji government held equal shareholdings.

After Fiji gained independence from Great Britain in 1970, the new national government began buying shares and the airline was renamed Air Pacific to reflect its regional presence.

By the early 1970s, seven Pacific island governments, some still under British rule at the time, held shares in Air Pacific, in addition to shares held by Qantas, Air New Zealand and the British Overseas Airways Corporation. However, the regional airline idea lost support as some of the shareholding Pacific island governments sold their shares and created their own national airlines.

In the 1970s, tourism became the nation's leading industry, which made the airline even more important to the Fijian economy; and the government of Fiji acquired a controlling interest in Air Pacific in 1974. In 1981, The New York Times published an article that included details on the Fiji government's plan to buy out more shareholders in order to gain more control of Air Pacific as the national airline. However, the airline received no subsidies from the government and had to buy its own aircraft.

In the 1990s the airline relocated its headquarters from the capital city of Suva to the coastal town of Nadi where the main international airport is located. The company also constructed an elaborate aircraft maintenance centre there. 

In 2007, Air Pacific acquired Sun Air, a domestic airline, renamed it Pacific Sun and began operations as Air Pacific's domestic and regional subsidiary.  In May 2012, Managing Director & CEO Dave Pflieger announced that the airline, which was completing a successful turnaround that included restructuring and re-fleeting, would be re-branded as "Fiji Airways" to help enhance sales and marketing of the airline and the south pacific island nation. In June 2014, Pacific Sun was rebranded to Fiji Link.

Flight history
Fiji Airways' first flight was on 1 September 1951, when a seven-seater de Havilland Dragon Rapide biplane departed Suva's Nausori Airport for Drasa Airport near Lautoka, on the west coast of the main island. The airline's first international flight to Brisbane, Australia was on 1 June 1973.

In 1983 it started flights to the US with a route to Honolulu called "Project America."

In December 2009, Air Pacific commenced a twice-weekly service to Hong Kong, which was increased to three services in January 2014. In July 2010 Air Pacific announced a new Suva-Auckland service.

Today, the airline and its domestic/regional subsidiary, Fiji Link, operate over 400 flights a week to almost 15 cities in 10 countries around the world.

Fleet history

In the beginning, Fiji Airways used small de Havilland Dragon Rapide and de Havilland Australia DHA-3 Drover aircraft. The fleet grew to include two ATR 42 turboprops and two leased jets, a Boeing 747 and a Boeing 767. By the late 1990s, the fleet included both Boeing 737 and 767 jets, while the ATR 42 turboprops were used on flights to neighboring islands.

Air Pacific also operated 2 BAC 111 Srs 479 jet aircraft from 1973 through to 1984. These aircraft operated across the airline's network including to Australia.

The 2000 Fijian coup d'état devastated the country's tourism industry and overall economy, which led to a substantial decrease in travel to Fiji. Faced with a falloff in air traffic, Air Pacific returned one of its two leased Boeing 747s.

In 2003, Air Pacific received the first of two Boeing 747-400s it was leasing from Singapore Airlines (They had previously been leased with Ansett Australia until Ansett's downfall in 2001).

In April 2011, Air Pacific announced that it had cancelled its order of eight Boeing 787-9s due to delivery delays of almost four years by Boeing. In October 2011, Air Pacific announced that it had ordered three Airbus A330-200s. In March 2013 the company received its first "Fiji Airways" re-branded Airbus A330. It was christened The Island of Taveuni and had its first flight to Auckland on 2 April. In June, one of the Boeing 747-400s was retired. The other one, although 'withdrawn from service', was used on an ad-hoc basis when needed. It was finally retired on 20 November 2013 where it was flown to be scrapped. Today the fleet includes two Airbus A350-900, four Airbus A330-200s, one Airbus A330-300, three Boeing 737-800s, and two Boeing 737 MAXs. Fiji Link operates two ATR 72-600, an ATR 42-600 and three de Havilland Canada DHC-6 Twin Otter aircraft. In preparation of the rebranding, Air Pacific retired its Boeing 747-412s from service.

On 2 May 2019. Fiji Airways announced its intention to lease two Airbus A350-900 from Dubai Aerospace Enterprise as a part of their fleet expansion.  They operate on routes to Australia, New Zealand and the United States. These A350 frames were originally to be delivered to Hong Kong Airlines, however following the cancellation of that order, they were purchased by Dubai Aerospace Enterprise.

As a result of the COVID-19 pandemic, Fiji Airways announced 800 job losses in Fiji on 25 May 2020.

Airline partnerships
In conjunction with Qantas, Air Pacific helped pioneer the concept of codeshare agreements in the early 1980s. Today, codesharing is an accepted airline practice all over the world. In the 1990s Air Pacific signed a codeshare agreement with Canadian Airlines, allowing it to transport traffic from Toronto on to Auckland, New Zealand. Soon after it struck a codeshare deal with American Airlines.

Qantas, which owned less than 20% of Air Pacific at the time, began a ten-year management contract with the airline in 1985 to help reverse the financial losses the company was struggling with. In 1986, Air Pacific posted a profit of nearly $100,000. In 1987 Qantas paid a reported $3.5 million for a 20 percent stake in Air Pacific. Qantas raised its equity from 17.45 percent to 46 percent in 1998.

On 25 January 1995 Air Pacific and the then Royal Tongan Airlines began a joint leasing of aircraft. The concept came complete with the livery of the two airlines painted on each side of the Boeing 737-300 fuselage.

Fiji Airways has a subsidiary airline Fiji Link (formerly Pacific Sun) that offers domestic flights and flights to the nearby islands of Tonga, Samoa, Tuvalu and Vanuatu. Fiji Airways is also a partner with the frequent flyer programmes of Alaska Airlines, American Airlines, and Qantas.

Fiji Airways code shares with Air Vanuatu, Alaska Airlines, American Airlines, Cathay Pacific, Hong Kong Airlines, Jetstar, Jetstar Asia, Qantas, Samoa Airways, Singapore Airlines, and Solomon Airlines.

Finally, Fiji Airways has been a Oneworld Connect Member of Oneworld airline alliance since 5 December 2018.

Rebranding as Fiji Airways
In May 2012, the airline announced that it would be rebranding and revert to its original name of Fiji Airways, with the rebranding coinciding with the delivery of the A330 aircraft in 2013. Fiji Airways' new brandmark, a "Masi symbol that epitomises Fiji and enhances the new name of Fiji's national carrier", was announced by Managing Director & CEO Dave Pflieger on 17 August 2012. The design was created by local Fijian Masi artist, Makereta Matemosi. The airline's new brand identity and colour scheme were fully revealed by the CEO and Prime Minister of Fiji at a formal red-carpet, black-tie event in Suva on 10 October 2012, in conjunction with Fiji Day.

The rebranding to Fiji Airways officially took place on 27 June 2013. The name change aimed to associate the airline more closely with the nation and to be more visible in search results. Also during the rebranding of Air Pacific to Fiji Airways, a new line of uniforms for its cabin crew was launched, and was designed by Fiji-based French designer Alexandra Poenaru-Philp. In China, the name Air Pacific was often confused with Hong Kong airline Cathay Pacific, Philippine airline Cebu Pacific and a Chinese air conditioning company. With the rebranding came a name change for the airline's booking classes. The Pacific Voyager (economy) and Tabua Class (business) of Air Pacific became the Fiji Airways' Economy and Fiji Airways' Business Class. The airline also launched a new website with the rebranding.

Corporate affairs

Ownership and structure
Fiji Airways is part of the Air Pacific Group (which includes the national airline, its wholly owned subsidiary Fiji Link, and a 38.75% stake in the Sofitel Fiji Resort & Spa on Denarau Island). The Air Pacific Group itself is owned by the Fijian government (51%), the Australian flag-carrier Qantas (46.32%), and Air New Zealand and the governments of Kiribati, Tonga, Nauru and Samoa each hold minor stakes.

Business trends
The airline was largely profitable from 1995 to 2004, but suffered back-to-back record losses of FJ$5.2 million for fiscal year 2008/2009 and FJ$65.3 million for 2009/2010. In the following years Fiji Airways was hovering around break even financial results. Finally, Stefan Pichler was selected as the airline's new MD/CEO and assumed his role in September 2013 in order to turn around the airline to sustainable profitability. In the following financial year 2013/14, the airline posted a FJ$65.2 million record profit.

The key trends for Fiji Airways, and the overall Group (including Fiji Link operations), are shown below (as at year ending 31 March until March 2013; year ending 31 December thereafter):

Sponsorships 
In October 2017, Fiji Airways announced its most comprehensive sponsorship to date, becoming the official airline of Fiji Rugby. The sponsorship saw Fiji Airways taking over the following Fiji Rugby teams with major naming and branding rights for the next five years: Fiji Airways Flying Fijians (15s team); Fiji Airways National 7s Team; Fiji Airways Fijiana 15s Team (Women's 15s team); Fiji Airways Fijiana 7s Team (Women's 7s team); Fiji Airways Drua; Fiji Link Referees (all referees in Fiji will be sponsored by and will wear Fiji Link branded apparel).

In February 2018, it announced its exclusive airline sponsorship  of Super Rugby champions, the BNZ Crusaders.

The airline is also a sponsor of the Fiji International Golf tournament.

Destinations 

Fiji Airways serves 26 direct-flight destinations in the Pacific Ocean region.  Fiji Airways is a member of the Oneworld Alliance as a 'connect' partner as of 5 December 2018.

Codeshare agreements
Fiji Airways codeshares with the following airlines:

 Air India
 Air New Zealand  
 Air Vanuatu 
 Alaska Airlines
 American Airlines 
 British Airways
 Cathay Pacific
 Finnair
 Hong Kong Airlines
 Japan Airlines
 Jetstar
 Jetstar Asia Airways
 Qantas
Samoa Airways
 Singapore Airlines
 Solomon Airlines

Fleet

Current fleet

, Fiji Airways fleet consists of the following aircraft:

Historical fleet

Fiji Airways formerly operated the following aircraft, including:

References

External links

 
 Air Pacific website archived at the Wayback Machine

Air New Zealand
Airlines established in 1947
Airlines of Fiji
British Overseas Airways Corporation
Government-owned airlines
Oneworld connect partners
Qantas
1947 establishments in Fiji